Brazil Iron Ltd. is a privately held company, headquartered in the United Kingdom. The company holds 24 contiguous iron and manganese tenements, through its Brazilian subsidiary, Brazil Iron Mineração LTDA.

The company is developing an integrated green pellet feed, pellet and HBI operation, using 100% renewable energy and green hydrogen with the aim of achieving net-zero carbon emissions.

Brazil Iron has been developing the project for over 10 years and are committed to delivering a world class sustainable project that will deliver the metals that the world needs in a responsible way.

According to the Brazilian National Mining Agency (ANM) Brazil Iron is the largest foreign investor in mineral research in Brazil, accounting for 63% of the mineral research investment in Bahia state.

Brazil Iron's project is located in the heart of Bahia state, Brazil. The project location is unique in that it has world class iron ore Resources, within an established and growing network of renewable energy generation projects. The natural ingredients of wind, sun, water and high-quality iron ore, allow the company to produced high quality direct reduction iron ore, whilst targeting net-zero carbon emissions. Over 8GW of renewable generation capacity is being installed within 50km of Brazil Iron's project. This low-cost renewable energy will be used to produce green hydrogen via electrolysis. Bahia state government are aiming to decarbonize all Bahian industries and have published a state plan for the Green Hydrogen Economy – PEH2V. This initiative is aligned with a federal push to increase green hydrogen production in Brazil.

Brazil Iron's project scores very well in terms of sustainability. The project's scope 1 and 2  green house gas emissions benefit from 100% renewable energy and green hydrogen production. The scope 3 emissions are also extremally low, due to the company producing high grade (68% Fe) direct reduction products that are suitable for use in electric arc furnaces during the steel making process. This dramatically reduces CO2 emissions compared with traditional blast furnaces.

History 
Brazil Iron and its Brazilian subsidiary were founded to sustainably explore for, develop and produce iron ore products, such as lump, sinter feed and pellet feed. The company was formed after the acquisition of mining rights in Brazil between 2011 and 2017.

References 

Companies based in London
Companies established in 2011
Mining companies of the United Kingdom